Chakilam Srinivasa Rao Also Titled as "Sardar" (20 February 1922 – 3 July 1996) born in a highly orthodox Niyogi Brahmin family, to Sri. Chakilam Rama Rao and Smt.Chakilam Venkatamma at Vemulapalli village in Nalgonda District on 22 February 1922. He was a very prominent, eminent social and political personality of 20th century in Nalgonda District of Andhra Pradesh, India.

He was elected thrice to the state's Legislative Assembly and had also served as Member of Parliament. 
He was a very ideal follower of Indian National Congress Party.
He was a very close and dearest associate to the then-Prime Minister's of India, Smt.Indira Gandhi, Sri.Rajiv Gandhi, Sri.P.V.Narasimha Rao.

He is renowned for breaking the domination of the communists in Nalgonda district through his daring and people centred approach. Though he was from an orthodox niyogi brahmin family he was not casteist in his mind. He was loved by all strata of society for his simplicity and service-mindedness. His leadership saw the growth of congress party in a communist den. His fearless and humane behaviour endeared him even to his opponents. Several attempts on his life by his political opponents in early 1960s and 70s failed due to his sheer grit and people's loyalty to him. It is said that he was given the title 'Sardar' by people of Nalgonda. He is also lovingly called "Panthulu garu" ( pandit ji ). 

He was a rationalist and a strong believer in self-determination and dignity of labour. His home in Nalgonda was an abode of simplicity, selflessness and service to people. He is a role model for the younger generation of politicians and youth in all fields of public life.

References

1922 births
1994 deaths
India MPs 1989–1991
Lok Sabha members from Andhra Pradesh
People from Nalgonda
People from Telangana